Rangasami Lakshminarayan Kashyap (born 28 March 1938 - died 11 November 2022) was an Indian applied mathematician and a Professor of Electrical Engineering at Purdue University.

He developed (with Harvard professor Yu-Chi Ho) the Ho-Kashyap rule, an important result (algorithm) in pattern recognition.

In 1982, he presented the Kashyap information criterion (KIC) to select the best model from a set of mathematical candidate models with different numbers of unknown parameters. These parameters are adjusted to adapt the models to data (observations) that have trends and statistical variation in the measured values.

He is a Fellow of the Institute of Electrical and Electronics Engineers, the International Association for Pattern Recognition, and the Indian Institute of Electronic and Telecommunication Engineers.

In the field of Vedic studies, he has made contribution including the complete translation into English all the four major and most ancient collection of verses in Sanskrit namely Rigveda Samhita, Krishna Yajurveda Samhita, and Samaveda, and Atharvaveda, consisting together of about 25000 metrical verses in the Sanskrit of Vedas (different from classical Sanskrit).

Kashyap is the only person in the world to translate all the 4 vedas recognizing his achievement he was honored by the Govt. of India with the prestigious Padma Shri award in 2021 under the Literature and Education field.

Biography

Education
Prof. Rangasami L. Kashyap received his early education in National College, Bangalore, Central College, and in Indian Institute of Science (the degrees of ME and DIISc). He was awarded the distinguished alumni award from IISc in 2010. Prof. Kashyap received his Ph.D from Harvard in 1966.

Career
Prof. Kashyap served as a Professor Emeritus of Electrical and Computer Engineering, at Purdue University, USA and was also the director of the Sri Aurobindo Kapali Sastry Institute of Vedic Culture. While at Purdue, he has published more than 200 research papers in advanced scientific Journals and delivered more than 200 papers at National and International conference, including several keynote speeches.

Awards
Prof. Kashyap received the IAPR King-Sun Fu Prize (1990) for fundamental contributions to pattern recognition. He was also awarded “Rajyotsava Award” in 2012 by the Govt. of Karnataka.

Selected publications

Thesis
Kashyap, R. L. (1965). Pattern classification and switching theory. PhD thesis, written under Yu-Chi Ho.

Articles
Kashyap, R.L. 1982; Optimal choice of AR and MA parts in autoregressive moving average models; Article printed in IEEE Transactions on Pattern Analysis and Machine Intelligence (PAMI); Published by IEEE; March 1982; volume PAMI-4(2); pages 99–104; 
Ho, Y.C. and Kashyap, R.L. 1965; An algorithm for linear inequalities and its applications; Article printed in IEEE Trans. Electron. Comput.; Published by IEEE; 1965; volume 14 (5); pages 683–688; http://ieeexplore.ieee.org/xpls/abs_all.jsp?4038553 ;  ; Access date 19 May 2008

References

External links
 www.vedah.com
https://www.amazon.com/Complete-Sanskrit-English-Translation-Explanation/dp/B00AX883KS

Control theorists
1938 births
Harvard University alumni
Purdue University faculty
Living people
Indian Institute of Science alumni
Fellow Members of the IEEE
Fellows of the International Association for Pattern Recognition